Capture (originally known as Capture the Crown) is an Australian metalcore band formed in early 2010 after the break-up of another metalcore outfit, Atlanta Takes State. The band rose to prominence under their original name Capture the Crown when they released the music video for their song, "You Call That a Knife? This Is a Knife!" (2011) on YouTube. The band was signed to Sumerian Records in December 2012 but were dropped in October the following year. Since their formation they have issued two studio albums, 'Til Death (18 December 2012), which appeared on three Billboard component charts Top Hard Rock (No. 21), Top Heatseekers (No. 7), and Top Independent Albums (No. 25), and Reign of Terror (5 August 2014), which charted at #86 on the U.S. Billboard 200. In August 2013 the group announced the proposed release of an extended play, Live Life, which was released on 4 February 2014. Later in 2014, they announced that they had signed with Artery Recordings. In March 2017, the group shortened its name to simply Capture and unveiled a new song under the new title.

History

Inception and 'Til Death (2010–2012) 
Formed in early 2010 in Sydney by Blake Ellis on guitar (later on bass guitar), Jye Menzies on guitar and Jeffrey Wellfare on lead vocals. The band gained popularity through their YouTube channel, and first release "You Call That a Knife? This Is a Knife!", quickly reaching five million views in under one year. All three, Wellfare, Menzies, and Ellis were previously in another metalcore band, Atlanta Takes State. While their music video quickly rose them to popularity in the scene, it also gained them criticism for resembling other bands in the genre, such as Asking Alexandria. Their original drummer, Tyler March (known by his nickname, Lone America, and for playing drums in A Late Night Serenade), is the only member not from Australia, being from Carlisle, Pennsylvania in the United States. The other members met him online and he was asked to join. Kris Sheehan joined in 2011, having played in Curse at 27 with Wellfare.

Four months later on 11 March 2012, the band released their second single, "#OIMATEWTF", which features guest vocals by Denis Shaforostov, from the band Make Me Famous at that time. The video reached almost 500,000 views in under six months. A month later, a cover of Jason Derülo's song "In My Head" was released, followed by the band's fourth single, "Ladies & Gentlemen... I Give You Hell", released 1 July 2012, reaching 350,000 views in just under two months.

On 20 August 2012, the band announced that they were supporting Woe, Is Me's Talk Your [S]#?!, We'll Give You a Reason Tour, with fellow supporting acts Chunk! No, Captain Chunk!, Our Last Night, Secrets, and The Seeking. On 19 November that year, the band was announced as part of Of Mice & Men's 2013 US Headlining tour with fellow acts Woe, Is Me, Texas in July, and Volumes from mid-January to early February.

On 24 November 2012 the band announced their debut album, Til Death on 18 December which they would be self-releasing and have pre-order packages set up on the band's webstore. With the announcement the band revealed the album's artwork and track listing. By 3 December 2012 the band had signed with Sumerian Records which would issue their forthcoming album. Along with the announcement, a music video for "Ladies & Gentlemen...I Give You Hell" appeared.

On 13 December the band began streaming a new single from their forthcoming album, "RVG" via YouTube. On 18 December 2012 the band's debut album, Til Death was released, which had been recorded at Chango Studios and produced and mixed by Cameron Mizell and mastered by Joey Sturgis. It appeared on three Billboard component charts Top Hard Rock (No. 21), Top Heatseekers (No. 7), and Top Independent Albums (No. 25).

Live Life and drop from Sumerian (2013–2014) 
On 11 March 2013 the band were announced to embark on Crown the Empire's first headlining tour, The Generation Now Tour from 7 to 26 May of that year with fellow acts Palisades, Heartist and Famous Last Words. On 3 April 2013 the band were announced as one of the initial bands for Vans Warped Tour UK alongside Rise Against, Yellowcard, Billy Talent, Real Friends and Crossfaith. The UK Warped Tour appearance took place on 16 and 17 November at London's Alexandra Palace for the second year in a row.

On 4 April 2013 the band were announced to play the 2013 All Stars Tour with fellow acts Every Time I Die, Chelsea Grin, Veil of Maya, Terror, Stray from the Path, Iwrestledabearonce, For All Those Sleeping and DayShell. They were joined by Volumes, and by Structures on select dates. On 20 May the group streamed their new single, "Rebearth" featuring Tyler Smith of The Word Alive, the single is from their proposed forthcoming EP, All Hype All Night. The band will be releasing their new single on 21 May.

On 17 July the band announced the All Hype All Night Tour beginning on 31 August through September with support acts, Secrets, Ice Nine Kills, My Ticket Home and City in the Sea. On 29 August the band were announced to play the 2013 Scream It Like You Mean It Tour after a schedule was leaked alongside other acts Like Moths to Flames, Hawthorne Heights and I Am King. Later that day the band released a lyric video for their next single, "All Hype All Night", via Alternative Press, the bands forthcoming EP was announced as coming soon through Sumerian Records.

On 30 October 2013, Sumerian Records announced that they had dropped Capture the Crown from their roster, with the statement "...We are now ready to let you know that we will be parting ways with Capture The Crown due to musical/creative differences. We wish them the best of luck in their future endeavors". The band provided their own statement, "We would like to thank Sumerian Records for everything they’ve helped us with over the span of our business relationship. In this time we were able to release our debut album, move to the US, tour with such great bands like Of Mice & Men, Every Time I Die, Chelsea Grin, Story of the Year & Volumes to name a few. Regardless of our current situation, the band is currently working on a brand new full-length album which you will hear more about in the near future. This may be the end of something good, but it’s also the start of something amazing!".

On 9 November the band announced that they would be cancelling their UK tour, but that they have been working really hard on a new album and will be heading into the studio in January. On 3 December 2013 the band announced that they have launched a $10,000 Indiegogo Campaign to fund their EP, Live Life, that they had been working on while a part of Sumerian Records. The next day the band an unmastered version of the track, "Live Life" from their forthcoming EP, with this song being the first release by the band not through Sumerian Records. On 14 December 2013 they were announced as support on Attila's The New Kings Tour from late January through February with fellow acts I See Stars, Ice Nine Kills and Myka Relocate.

Label change, Reign of Terror (2014–2016)

On 22 December 2013, Blake Ellis announced his departure from the band on his personal Facebook page with the statement "...“It is with great sadness that due to recent events I will no longer be playing bass for Capture The Crown, a band that I formed & have been in since the very beginning." Two days later the band released a picture announcing that Gus Farias of the band Volumes would be providing guest vocals on a song from their forthcoming EP.

On 5 January 2014 Matt Good (of From First to Last) tweeted that he would be producing Capture the Crown's new album alongside producer Taylor Larson (Periphery, Sky Eats Airplane) in DC. The following day the band announced that they had doubled their initial crowdfunding funding goal with US$22,207, they will now be able to retrieve the rights to their already recorded EP, and head into the studio to begin recording their new album. On 9 April 2014, they would be signed by Artery Recordings.

On 2 June 2014 the band announced that their new album "Reign Of Terror" will be released on 5 August 2014. On 9 June 2014, the band released the song "To Whom It May Concern", the first single from the album. The band later released two more songs from the album – "I Hate You" (Released on 1 July 2014)  and "Make War, Not Love" feat. Alex Koehler from Chelsea Grin (Released on 24 July 2014.)
Reign of Terror was released on 5 August and charted at number 86 on the Billboard 200 in the U.S.

In October 2014 guitarists Jye Menzies & Kris Sheehan along with drummer Tyler March had also left the band. Jye cited the band becoming a negative force in his life as a reason for his departure. The band released an official statement on their Facebook page confirming the news. It was also announced by the band on 26 October that the other new guitarist is Mitch Rogers. Silently in 2015, Joe Abikhair (formerly of Hunt The Haunted and Empires Fall) replaced Ryan Seritti on drums – starting from their first ever Australian tour.

From March until April 2016, the group toured the United States with Slaves, Myka Relocate, Outline in Color and Conquer Divide.

Name change and Lost Control (2016–present)
On 30 July 2016, the band released a new single, 'The Lake' off their upcoming album. On 14 March 2017, the band wrote "RIP CTC" on their social media, leading to their fans to thinking that the band broke up. However, the band's Instagram posted a teaser under new name Capture. It contained a short clip of a song and a list of upcoming tour dates in the USA. Shortly thereafter, the full song, called "Lost Control," was released through Artery Recordings. The band explained that it wanted to turn the page into a new project and move past the so-called "negativity" of the metalcore scene without alienating Capture the Crown's earlier fans. Despite this, the band would then go on an unannounced hiatus until August 2018, when they announced that they would be going on tour with MyChildren MyBride, Secrets, Earth Groans, and Half Hearted on MyChildren MyBride's Unbreakable 10th Anniversary Tour in October. On 12 July 2019 the band released a new song titled 'No Cure' along with the announcement of a new album titled Lost Control set for release on 16 August 2019.

Band members 
Jeffrey Welfare – lead vocals (2010–present)
Manny Dominick – drums (2017–present)
Erik Vaughn Weatherford III – bass, backing vocals (2019–present)

Past members
Blake Ellis – rhythm guitar (2010–2013), bass (2013)
Jye Menzies – lead guitar (2010–2014)
Kris Sheehan – bass (2010–2013), rhythm guitar (2013–2014)
Tyler "Lone America" March – drums (2010–2014)
Kyle Devaney – lead guitar (2014–2015)
Ryan Seritti – drums (2014–2015)
Joe Abikhair – drums (2015–2016)
Alec Hoxsey – drums (2016)
Mitch Rogers – rhythm guitar (2014–2016), lead guitar (2015–2016)
Maurice Morfaw – bass (2014–2016)
Robert Weston – bass (2017)
Alex Maggard – lead guitar, rhythm guitar, backing vocals (2016–2018), bass (2017–2018)

Discography

Studio albums
as Capture the Crown:
 'Til Death (2012)
 Reign of Terror (2014)
as Capture:
 Lost Control (2019)

EPs
 Live Life (2014)

Singles
 "You Call That a Knife? This Is a Knife!" (2011, 'Til Death)
 "Ladies & Gentlemen... I Give You Hell" (2011, 'Til Death)
 "#OIMATEWTF" (featuring Denis Shaforostov  formerly of Make Me Famous) (2012, 'Til Death)
 "In My Head (Jason Derulo Cover)" (2012)
 "RVG" (2012, 'Til Death)
 "Rebearth" (featuring Tyler Smith of The Word Alive) (2013, Live Life)
 "Live Life" (featuring Gus Farias of Volumes) (2014, Live Life)
 "To Whom It May Concern"  (2014, Reign Of Terror)
 "I Hate You"  (2014, Reign Of Terror)
 "Make War, Not Love" (featuring Alex Koehler formerly of Chelsea Grin) (2014, Reign Of Terror)
 "The Lake"  (2016, Lost Control)
 "Lost Control" (2017, Lost Control)
 "Dingbats" (2017, Lost Control)
 "No Cure" (2019, Lost Control)

Videography
 "You Call That a Knife? This Is a Knife!" (2011, 'Til Death)
 "Ladies & Gentlemen... I Give You Hell" (2012, 'Til Death)
 "Bloodsuckers" (2014, Live Life)
 "Firestarter" (2014, Reign Of Terror)
 "Dingbats" (2017, Lost Control)
 "No Cure" (2019, Lost Control)

See also

Music of Sydney

References

External links
 

2010 establishments in Australia
Australian metalcore musical groups
Electronicore musical groups
Musical groups established in 2010
Musical quintets
Sumerian Records artists
Musical groups from Sydney
Artery Recordings artists
Australian heavy metal musical groups